Akrodha (Sanskrit: अक्रोध) literally means "free from anger". It's considered an important virtue in Indian philosophy and Hindu ethics.

Etymology
Akrodha is a fusion word between the Sanskrit prefix a (Sanskrit: अ; "without", "non") and the term krodha (Sanskrit: क्रोध; "anger"), meaning "without anger". A related word is Akrodhah (Sanskrit: अक्रोध), which also means "absence of anger".

Discussion
Akrodha is considered a virtue and desirable ethical value in Hinduism. When there is cause of getting angry but even then there is absence of anger, it is non-anger or akrodha. Absence of anger (akrodha) means being calm even when insulted, rebuked or despite great provocation. Akrodha does not mean absence of causes of anger, it means not getting angry and keeping an even, calm temper despite the circumstances.

Krodha ("anger") is excessive mental turmoil on account of the obstacles in the gratification of some desire; it is manifestation of the quality of tamas (dark, negative, destructive), an undesirable psychological state. The opposite of Krodha is Akrodha, and this is a productive, positive and constructive state.

Bhawuk states that akrodha is necessary to any process of peace. Peace and happiness is a state of contentment (santustah), where there is absence of spite or envy (advestah), absence of anger (akrodhah), and absence of violence (ahimsa). Dharma relies on akrodha, because it creates an environment of serenity, a rational principle of life, and because it is a moral virtue inspired by love.

Literature
According to Vedic sages, when work becomes akin to a yajna (a worship ceremony), the effect of that work is transformed into apurva, that is, it becomes something unique, unprecedented and empowering. In contrast, anger clouds reason, which results in the loss of discrimination between right and wrong and virtue and vice. When the discriminating faculty is ruined, the person loses self-identity and the inner good perishes. With freedom from anger, a person reaches an apurva state.

The Upanishads
The Naradaparivrajaka Upanishad states the nature of akrodha for a person who seeks self-knowledge and liberation (kaivalya) as follows:

Akrodha, states Manickam, is related to the concept Sahya (Sanskrit: सह्य) in the Upanishads. Sahya means, depending on the context, "to bear", "endure", "suffer", and "put up with". The quality to Sahya is considered an ethical value in Hinduism, not out of weakness to react, but for the cause of the Ultimate Truth. It is the attribute by which a person willingly bears negative cognitive inputs in order to "win over" the opponent or whatever is offensive, in the pursuit of holding on to Truth, in order to achieve oneness with Brahman, the Ultimate Truth. This endurance, this strive to overcome the adversaries, through akrodha and ahimsa, is recommended as the constructive way in one's pursuit of "Truth".

The Epics
The Hindu epic Mahabharata repeatedly emphasizes the virtue of akrodha. For example, in Adi Parva, it states:

In Vana Parva, the Mahabharata states:

In Shanti Parva, the Mahabharata states:

The Bhagavad Gita (Slokas XVI.1–3), in the Mahabharata, gives a list of twenty-six divine attributes beginning with abhayam ("fearlessness") and sattva sansuddhih ("purity of mind"), ending with adroha ("bearing enmity to none") and naatimaanita ("absence of arrogance"):

अभयं सत्त्वसंशुध्दिर्ज्ञानयोगव्यवस्थितिः|
दानं दमश्च यज्ञश्च स्वाध्यायस्तप आर्जवम् ||

अहिंसा सत्यमक्रोधस्त्यागः शान्तिरपैशुनम् |
दया भूतेष्वलोलुप्त्वं मार्दवं ह्रीरचापलाम् ||

तेजः क्षमा धृतिः शौचमद्रोहो नातिमानिता |
भवन्ति सम्पदं दैवीमभिजातस्य भारत ||

Akrodha is one of the twenty six divine attributes a person can have, states the Bhagavad Gita.

Dharmasastra
Manu has listed akrodha ("absence of anger") among the ten primary virtues. The Apastambhadharmasutra (I.iii.22) rules that a student be not given to anger,  and that a house-holder is required to abstain from anger and abstain from action or words that would provoke someone else to anger (II.xviii.2). The Baudhayanadharmasutra (I.xv.30) requires a house-holder never to be angry, and the Gautamdharmasutra (II.13) advises that he must not feel angry. The Vashisthadharmasutra (IV.4) avers that refraining from anger is a virtue like truthfulness, charity among others.

Manu mentions ten Dharma Lakshanas, akrodha is one of these lakshana (attribute, sign of a dharmic person). The other nine are: Dhriti (patience), Kshama (forgiveness), Damah (temperance), Asteya (non-stealing), Shaucham (purity), Indriyaigraha (freedom from sensual craving), Dhi (reason), Vidya (knowledge), and Satyam (truth).

Shaivism
The Shaivite doctrine considers four yamas for the Pashupata ascetic who smears on his body bhasam; the four yamas are – non-injury, celibacy, truthfulness and non-stealing; the niyamas consist of non-irritability (akrodha), attendance on the teachers, purity, lightness of diet and carefulness (apramada). Akrodha is a virtue.

Universalism
Hinduism and Buddhism both suggest ten freedoms needed for good life. These are – Ahimsa ('freedom from violence'), Asteya ('freedom from want, stealing'), Aparigraha ('freedom from exploitation'), Amritava ('freedom from early death') and Arogya ('freedom from disease'), Akrodha ('freedom of anger'), Jnana or Vidya ("freedom from ignorance"), Pravrtti ("freedom of conscience"), Abhaya ('freedom from fear') and Dhrti ('freedom from frustration and despair').

See also
Ahiṃsā
Satya
Asteya
Brahmacharya
Kṣamā
Dhṛti
Dayā
Mitahara
Ārjava
Shaucha
Dāna

References

Upanishadic concepts
Vedas
Hindu philosophical concepts
Buddhist philosophical concepts
Buddhist ethics
Hindu ethics
Yoga concepts